Robert Chapuis (born 7 May 1933) is a French politician.

Chapuis served as vice-president of the National Union of Students of France (UNEF) from 1955 to April 1956, during which time he was responsible for union branches in the French overseas territories. As former head of Jeunesse Étudiante Chrétienne (JEC), a Christian student youth organization, he played a major role in the shifting post-colonial focus of the UNEF. He was the National Secretary of the Unified Socialist Party (PSU) from 26 November 1973 to 14 December 1974.

In 1983, he proposed a law on the creation of a parliamentary office to evaluate scientific and technological options, OPECST. During this period his parliamentary attaché was Manuel Valls.

In 1988 and 1991 during the government of Prime Minister Michel Rocard, he served as Secretary of State in the Ministry of Education, he was responsible for of technological education.

He was vice-president of the General Council of the Ardèche, mayor of the city of Teil, and the deputy parliamentary member representing the Ardèche. He is now retired from political office but still active with the PSU and often comments on political issues.

Bibliography 
 1976: Les chrétiens et le socialisme : témoignage et bilan ordre des choses.	Calmann-Lévy. 270 p. , 
 2007: Si Rocard avait su... : Témoignage sur la deuxième gauche. L'Harmattan : Paris. Coll. "Des Poings et des Roses". 246 p. , .
 2008: La rose et la croix. Socialistes et chrétiens, L'Encyclopédie du socialisme. ,

See also 
 Unified Socialist Party (France)
 Manuel Valls
  La politique en Ardèche
  Liste de personnalités de l'UNEF
  Robert Chapuis
  Teil

References

External links 
 Photograph of Robert Chapuis at a meeting of the PSU in 1973 by Jean Gaumy/Magnum
 
L'Office Universitaire de Recherche Socialiste (L'OURS)
Le socialisme à l’épreuve de l’écologie, by Robert-Chapuis
 Entretien avec Robert Chapuis

French politicians
1933 births
Living people